Signed, Sealed & Delivered is the 12th studio album by American recording artist Stevie Wonder, released on August 7, 1970, by Tamla Records. The album featured four hits that hit the Billboard Hot 100: "Signed, Sealed, Delivered I'm Yours" (#3), "Heaven Help Us All" (#9), "Never Had a Dream Come True" (#26) and Wonder's cover of The Beatles' "We Can Work It Out" (#13). The album hit #25 on the Billboard Pop Albums chart as well as #7 on the R&B Albums chart.

This was Wonder's first album on which he was given producer credit, though he actually produced only two of the tracks and co-produced three more. He wrote or co-wrote seven of the tracks.

Critical reception 

Reviewing for The Village Voice in 1970, Robert Christgau said Signed, Sealed & Delivered has flawed moments, but Motown albums are rarely consistent. He concluded the album is "still the most exciting LP by a male soul singer in a very long time, and it slips into no mold, Motown's included." Rolling Stone magazine's Vince Aletti said that the album "holds more creative singing than you're likely to find in another performer's entire body of work." Aletti felt that, although not all of the songs match the energy of the title track, the album does not have a bad song and includes an "extraordinary" cover of "We Can Work It Out" that shares the other songs' "tasteful, unencumbered" arrangements.

In his list for The Village Voice, Christgau named Signed, Sealed and Delivered the eleventh best album of 1970, and later called it the best soul album of the year. In a retrospective review, Allmusic's Ron Wynn gave the album three out of five stars, noting that Wonder's focus seemed to be more on social issues than commercial concerns, and found songs such as "I Can't Let My Heaven Walk Away" and "Never Had a Dream Come True" as intriguing as the hit title track and "We Can Work It Out".

Track listing

Side one
"Never Had a Dream Come True" (Stevie Wonder, Henry Cosby, Sylvia Moy) – 3:13
"We Can Work It Out" (John Lennon, Paul McCartney) – 3:19
"Signed, Sealed, Delivered I'm Yours" (Lee Garrett, Lula Mae Hardaway, Wonder, Syreeta Wright) – 2:41
"Heaven Help Us All" (Ron Miller) – 3:13
"You Can't Judge a Book by Its Cover" (Cosby, Pam Sawyer, Wonder) – 2:32
"Sugar" (Don Hunter, Wonder) – 2:52

Side two
"Don't Wonder Why" (Leonard Caston) – 4:54
"Anything You Want Me To Do" (Hunter, Hardaway, Paul Riser, Wonder) – 2:19
"I Can't Let My Heaven Walk Away" (Joe Hinton, Sawyer) – 2:53
"Joy (Takes Over Me)" (Duke Browner) – 2:12
"I Gotta Have a Song" (Hunter, Hardaway, Riser, Wonder) – 2:32
"Something to Say" (Hunter, Wonder) – 3:26

Personnel 
 Stevie Wonder – lead vocals, backing vocals (side 1, tracks 1, 2, and 6; side 2, tracks 2–5), harmonica, drums, percussion, piano, organ, clavinet
 The Andantes – backing vocals (side 2, tracks 1, 3, and 4)
 Wonderlove (Lynda Laurence, Venetta Fields, and Syreeta Wright) – backing vocals (side 1, tracks 3 and 5)
 The Originals – backing vocals (side 2, track 1)  
 James Jamerson – bass
 Bob Babbitt – bass (side 1, tracks 2 and 3) 
 Dennis Coffey – guitar
 Eddie Willis – sitar (side 1, track 3) 
 Richard "Pistol" Allen – drums 
 The Funk Brothers – all other instruments
 Track 1 produced by Henry Cosby
 Tracks 2, 3 produced by Stevie Wonder
 Track 4 produced by Ron Miller and Tom Baird
 Track 11 produced by Don Hunter and Stevie Wonder

References

External links 
 

Stevie Wonder albums
1970 albums
Tamla Records albums
Albums produced by Henry Cosby
Albums produced by Stevie Wonder
Albums recorded at Hitsville U.S.A.
Albums arranged by Paul Riser